Apronius is a genus within the subfamily Stenopodainae of Reduviidae. Five species are known, most from South America.

Partial list of species
Apronius froeschneri
Apronius granulosus

References

Reduviidae
Hemiptera of South America